Chalcosoma is a genus of Southeast Asian rhinoceros beetles. They are known as three horned rhinoceros beetles for their trident like horn. They are endemic to Southeast Asia.

Species
Biolib lists four species:

Chalcosoma atlas
Chalcosoma chiron - this species of a senior synonym of:
 Chalcosoma caucasus and 
 Chalcosoma janssensi
Chalcosoma moellenkampi
Chalcosoma engganensis

See also 

 List of largest insects

References

External links

Dynastinae